Aspidoscopulia is a genus of glass sponge in the family Farreidae.

References

Sponge genera
Hexactinellida